Radio Rondo/Schaffhausen Concert is a live album by Barry Guy and the London Jazz Composers' Orchestra with pianist Irène Schweizer. It was recorded on May 21, 2008, at the Schaffhauser Jazzfestival in Schaffhausen, Switzerland, and was released in 2009 by Intakt Records. The album features a 15-minute Schweizer solo followed by a 30-minute composition by Guy on which the pianist is featured.

Reception

In a review for The Guardian, John Fordham called Schweizer's solo "a dazzling exposition... in which her rhythmic precision and instinct for contrast unwrap a tour de force of post-Cecil Taylor free-jazz piano." Regarding "Radio Rondo," he wrote: "Schweizer drives clusters of low chords through the dialogue, and rich low sax sounds usher in a more lyrical section before scurrying orchestral motifs crowd around her. It must have been quite a show to witness."

Nic Jones of All About Jazz commented: "What makes the music notable is the degree to which it's reflective of fearsome intelligence at work," and praised Schweizer's playing, noting: "Her accommodation with the moment is entirely her own, and the same is true of the manner in which she not only conjures up an idea but also teases it out, wringing it out for telling effect. It seems like second nature for her to know exactly when it's outlived its usefulness." Concerning Guy's composition, he remarked: "At no point does the music congeal, despite the momentum of the piece being far from linear. Instead, it's the very discontinuities that are essential to this music's overall success, which in itself sets out a manifesto for its ongoing vitality."

Writing for Exclaim!, Glen Hall stated that "Schaffhausen Concert" is "constantly energetic, probing and bristling with lively thoughts" featuring "muscular chording, swirling single-note passages, often with jazzy implications that transform into new music comments from, say, David Tudor's vocabulary." He described "Radio Rondo" as "dramatic, structured and well realized," and "a strong foil for the intense pianist's improv skills."

In an article for Paris Transatlantic, Clifford Allen remarked: "Schweizer is one of the most lyrical of postwar European pianists, handling fleet action with glassine delicacy. Here, she's both orchestrator and orchestra." He noted that in relation to Guy's earlier piano concertos, "Radio Rondo" is "much more open-ended, though there's still a strong composerly sensibility in evidence," and wrote that it "hinges on contrasts between large masses of sound in either static or extremely vibrant motion, and smaller, sometimes hushed group interplay, frequently with Schweizer at the center."

Track listing

 "Schaffhausen Concert" (Irène Schweizer) – 15:25
 "Radio Rondo" (Barry Guy) – 30:01

Personnel 
 Barry Guy – bass, conductor
 Irène Schweizer – piano
 Evan Parker – reeds
 Mats Gustafsson – reeds
 Peter McPhail – reeds
 Simon Picard – reeds
 Trevor Watts – reeds
 Henry Lowther – trumpet
 Herb Robertson – trumpet
 Rich Laughlin – trumpet
 Alan Tomlinson – trombone
 Conrad Bauer – trombone
 Johannes Bauer – trombone
 Per Åke Holmlander – tuba
 Philipp Wachsmann – violin
 Barre Phillips – bass
 Lucas Niggli – percussion
 Paul Lytton – percussion

References

2009 live albums
Barry Guy live albums
Irène Schweizer live albums
Intakt Records live albums